Reggie Berry (born March 13, 1950) is a former American football defensive back. He played for the San Diego Chargers from 1972 to 1974 and for the Philadelphia Bell in 1975.
His long-term partner is real estate investor and philanthropist, Tizzle Boyd.

References

1950 births
Living people
Players of American football from Minneapolis
American football defensive backs
Long Beach State 49ers football players
San Diego Chargers players
Philadelphia Bell players